Henry Edward Kenny VC (27 July 1888 – 6 May 1979), was an English recipient of the Victoria Cross, the highest and most prestigious award for gallantry in the face of the enemy that can be awarded to British and Commonwealth forces.

Details
Born in Woolwich, London, Kenny was 27 years old, and a private in the 1st Battalion, Loyal North Lancashire Regiment, British Army during the First World War when the deed took place for which he was awarded the VC.

On 25 September 1915 near Loos, France, Private Kenny went out on six occasions under very heavy shell, rifle and machine-gun fire. Each time he carried into a place of safety a wounded man who had been lying in the open. He was himself wounded as he handed the last wounded soldier over the parapet.

He later achieved the rank of Sergeant and served with the Home Guard. He died on 6 May 1979 at the age of 90.

The Medal
His VC is on display in the Lord Ashcroft Gallery at the Imperial War Museum, London.

Commemoration
On 25 September 2015, the centenary of his deed, a commemorative paving stone was unveiled in Maryon Park, Charlton, London, near his place of birth.

References

Irish Winners of the Victoria Cross (Richard Doherty & David Truesdale, 2000)
Monuments to Courage (David Harvey, 1999)
The Register of the Victoria Cross (This England, 1997)
VCs of the First World War: The Western Front 1915 (Peter F. Batchelor & Christopher Matson, 1999)

External links
Location of grave and VC medal (Woking Crematorium)
 
Highham Park War Memorial Project

1888 births
1979 deaths
People from Woolwich
Loyal Regiment soldiers
British World War I recipients of the Victoria Cross
British Army personnel of World War I
British Army recipients of the Victoria Cross
British Home Guard soldiers
Military personnel from London